Baron Péter Perényi (1502 – Wien, 2 March 1548) was a Hungarian aristocrat who held the office of voivode of Transylvania from 1526 to 1529. He was an influential protector of Protestant preachers in the Kingdom of Hungary.

Since 1541 he held the title of Prince of the Holy Roman Empire (Prince of Siklos) but never used this title publicly.

References

Sources 

1502 births
1548 deaths
Voivodes of Transylvania
Peter
16th-century Hungarian nobility